The XV International Chopin Piano Competition was held from 2 to 24 October 2005 in Warsaw, organized by the . The competition was won by Rafał Blechacz of Poland, who prevailed against 80 competitors from 18 countries.

This was the first competition that was completely broadcast on TV, radio and on the internet.

Awards 

For the first time, the competition introduced a preliminary round, as selecting participants from submitted recordings only was deemed not wholly reliable.

In the most decisive showing in the history of the competition, Rafał Blechacz took First Prize and the special prizes for the best performance of a polonaise, mazurka, and concerto. No other pianist has achieved this feat. One of the judges, Piotr Paleczny, said that Blechacz "so outclassed the remaining finalists that no second prize could actually be awarded." Another judge, John O'Conor, called Blechacz "one of the greatest artists I have had a chance to hear in my entire life". Blechacz was the first Pole to win the prize since 1975, when Krystian Zimerman won.

The following prizes were awarded: 

In addition, three special prizes were awarded independently:

Jury 
The jury consisted of:
  Vera Gornostayeva
  Lidia Grychtołówna
  Adam Harasiewicz ( V)
  Krzysztof Jabłoński
  Andrzej Jasiński (chairman)
  Choong-Mo Kang
  Vladimir Krainev
  Hiroko Nakamura
  John O'Conor
  Janusz Olejniczak
  Piotr Paleczny (vice-chairman)
  John Perry
  
   (5th X)
  Bernard Ringeissen
  Regina Smendzianka
  
   Đặng Thái Sơn ( X)
  Arie Vardi
  Fanny Waterman
  Zhou Guangren

References

Further reading

External links 
 

 

International Chopin Piano Competition
2005 in music
2005 in Poland
2005 in Polish music
2000s in Warsaw
October 2005 events in Europe